"Stone Cold Sober" is the debut single by English recording artist Paloma Faith from the album Do You Want the Truth or Something Beautiful? (2009). It was released on 15 June 2009 and entered the UK chart at number 17.

Background
The theme of the song is the predicament of appearing to be one thing and actually being quite another. Faith told Q July 2009 about the Do You Want the Truth or Something Beautiful? album: "My vocal style suits the subject matter of my album. It's about the human condition, the constant striving for love and companionship. I've thrown my heart at many a wrong man in my time, I can't tell you. I'm the queen of tragedy. Melancholy informs everything I do."

This song is featured in the commercial for the Max Lashes product manufactured by cosmetics company Rimmel London. The B-side, meanwhile, featured in an 'Alcohol: Know Your Limits' public information film run by the NHS  about binge drinking in 2008.

Critical reception
Digital Spy gave the song 4/5 stars and a positive review stating: "'Stone Cold Sober' makes the most of her theatrical background. Sure, it's another slice of post-Winehouse retro-pop, but it's more interesting that most tunes of that ilk, partly because it's a got a chorus you could quite easily do the can-can to, and partly because Faith gives it more sass than a backchatting teenager. Maybe a spell in the circus should be compulsory for all pop wannabes?"

BBC Chart Blog gave the song a mixed review with 3/5 stars: "'Stone Cold Sober' is more of an uptempo rockin' raveup than it is an old school soul resurrection (with desperate lyrics, let us not forget), there are a LOT of little clues scattered through this endeavour which suggest Paloma is being sold as a sequel to a very successful franchise."

Chart performance
"Stone Cold Sober" had moderate success throughout the charts, being most successful in the UK, peaking at number 17 and spending three weeks in the chart. The song peaked at number 70 in Germany, 45 in Australia, 36 in Switzerland and number 30 in New Zealand.

Music video
The music video for the song was directed by the British music video director Sophie Muller.

Track listing
Digital download

Charts

Release history

References

External links
 Songfacts Song Info
 Guardian.co.uk - Music: New band of the day – Paloma Faith

2009 debut singles
Paloma Faith songs
Songs written by Paloma Faith
2009 songs
Epic Records singles
Songs written by Blair MacKichan
Music videos directed by Sophie Muller